Mauro Galvano (born 30 March 1964 in Fiumicino, Roma) was a professional boxer and former WBC Super Middleweight Champion.

Amateur career
As an amateur, Galvano was the 1984 Italian Middleweight Champion and the 1985 Italian Light-Heavyweight Champion.

Professional career
Galvano turned pro in 1986 and won the Vacant WBC Super Middleweight Title with a decision win over Dario Walter Matteoni in 1990.  He defended the belt twice before losing it to Nigel Benn via TKO in 1992.  In the rematch with Benn in 1993, Galvano again came up short in a decision loss.  He retired in 1997.

Career Record:
Won 30 (KOs 7)  Lost 8  Drawn 2  Total 40

External links
 

1964 births
Living people
People from Fiumicino
Italian male boxers
Super-middleweight boxers
Sportspeople from the Metropolitan City of Rome Capital